Joseph John Urso (September 17, 1916 – April 27, 1991) was an American professional basketball player and head coach. He played in the National Basketball League for the Pittsburgh Raiders during the 1944–45 season as well as for the Youngstown Bears during the 1945–46 season. Urso served as a player-coach for the Raiders (the only year the team existed). In college, he lettered in both basketball and golf at Duquesne University.

References

1916 births
1991 deaths
American men's basketball players
Basketball players from Pennsylvania
Duquesne Dukes men's golfers
Duquesne Dukes men's basketball players
Guards (basketball)
Pittsburgh Raiders coaches
Pittsburgh Raiders players
Sportspeople from Hamilton, Ohio
Youngstown Bears players